Alexandra Marguerite Clémentine Cousteau (born March 21, 1976) is a filmmaker, sustainability keynote speaker and an environmental activist. Cousteau continues the work of her grandfather Jacques-Yves Cousteau and father Philippe Cousteau. Cousteau advocates the importance of conservation, restoration and sustainable management of ocean and water resources for a healthy planet and productive societies.

Personal life
Cousteau is the daughter of Philippe Cousteau and Jan Cousteau and the granddaughter of French explorer and filmmaker Jacques-Yves Cousteau and Simone Cousteau. She is a member of the third generation Cousteau family who explore and explain the natural world. At the age of four months, Cousteau first went on expedition with her father, Philippe Cousteau and learned to scuba dive with her grandfather, Jacques-Yves Cousteau, when she was seven.

Education 
Cousteau earned a  bachelor's degree in political science (International Relations) from Georgetown College in 1998. In May 2016, she received an honorary degree of Doctor of Humane Letters from Georgetown University, her alma mater.

Career 
In 2000, Cousteau co-founded EarthEcho International with her brother Philippe Cousteau Jr. to further her family's legacy in science, advocacy, and education.

From 2005 to 2007, Cousteau worked on ocean conservation issues in Central America as an advisor for MarViva.

Cousteau and her team filmed a range of critical water issues on the Colorado River, the Gulf Coast, the Tennessee Valley, the Great Lakes, and Chesapeake Bay and also stopped in 20 communities along the route to host watershed action days. 

In 2014, she led an expedition to Canada in partnership with the Ottawa Riverkeeper and Aqua Hacking 2015, a conference focused on protecting the river. It's a joint initiative between Ottawa Riverkeeper, Alexandra Cousteau's Blue Legacy, and the de Gaspe Beaubien Foundation.

Cousteau is also a member of the board of Neom, a planned cross-border city in northwestern Saudi Arabia developed by Saudi Crown Prince Mohammad bin Salman.

In 2019, she co-founded Oceans2050, where currently serves as president. Oceans2050 is an ambitious project that aims to restore ocean abundance by the year 2050.

Cousteau is a globally popular speaker on sustainability, conservation and resilience to climate change.

References

External links 
 El Mundo interview (Spanish)

1976 births
Living people
American environmentalists
American women environmentalists
American people of French descent
American underwater divers
Alexandra
French environmentalists
French women environmentalists
French underwater divers
Georgetown College (Georgetown University) alumni
People from Santa Monica, California
Activists from Washington, D.C.
21st-century American women